Chlorophane, also sometimes known as pyroemerald, cobra stone, and pyrosmaragd, is a rare variety of the mineral fluorite with the unusual combined properties of thermoluminescence, thermophosphoresence, triboluminescence, and fluorescence: it will emit light in the visible spectrum when exposed to ultraviolet light, when heated, and when rubbed; if heated, it will continue to emit light for a period of time after a heat source is withdrawn. The small amount of heat generated by being held in the hand has been reported as enough to induce luminescence, though this may be the result of experimental error. Although chemically very similar to fluorite, chlorophane has several impurities including magnesium, aluminum, manganese, and traces of iron and sodium (none of which occur in fluorite).   it was still not known which if any of these impurities imparts to chlorophane the luminescent properties that distinguish it from fluorite. Some samples of chlorophane, particularly those exposed to high temperatures, will only luminesce once or will do so with only weakened intensity over time. This effect, which was reported many times without having been observed, was eventually attributed in part to a combination of both heat and light acting on the mineral.

The unusual properties of chlorophane have been attributed to samarium, terbium, dysprosium, gadolinium, ytterbium, and yttrium; none of these rare earth elements, however, has been consistently found in all chlorophane specimens.

References

Calcium minerals
Halide minerals